Rafael "Rafa" Múñoz Pérez (born 3 March 1988) is an Olympic swimmer from Spain. He competed for the Spanish Olympic team at the 2008 Olympic Games. He was born in Córdoba.

On April 5, 2009, at the 2009 Spanish Championships, he swam a 22.43 in the long-course 50 butterfly, going under the existing World Record of 22.96 by South Africa's Roland Schoeman. This time, however, was not recognized as the world record until 22 June, when the governing body of aquatic sports, FINA, finally accepted the controversial swimsuit he and many other swimmers had been wearing as they achieved such times. 

He is coached by Romain Barnier in France in the Cercle des Nageurs de Marseille team.

His suited WR was broken in July 2018, however three of the five best times all-time still belongs to Muñoz (all of these achieved with tech suit).

Notes

References

External links
 
 
 
 

1988 births
Living people
Spanish male butterfly swimmers
Olympic swimmers of Spain
Swimmers at the 2008 Summer Olympics
World record setters in swimming
World Aquatics Championships medalists in swimming
European Aquatics Championships medalists in swimming